Siilinjärven Palloseura (abbreviated SiPS) is a football club from Siilinjärvi, Finland. The club was formed in 1974 and their home ground is at the Ahmo urheilualue.  The men's first team currently plays in the Kolmonen (Third Division).

Background

The club has evolved dramatically in recent years and now has around 350 members.  In Autumn 2009 the Ahmo urheilualue (sports area) was opened by the club, including the Yara Arena sports hall and a full size artificial turf football pitch

During the period 1997 to 2007 SiPS competed in the Kolmonen but in 2008 withdrew because of economic reasons.  However the men's first team re-formed in 2009 and competed in the Nelonen.  Their first season back was a great success which culminated in promotion back to the Kolmonen.

Season to season

Club Structure

Siilinjärven Palloseura run a large number of teams including 2 men's teams, 1 ladies teams, 9 boys teams and 3 girls teams.

The junior section of the club has around 300 registered players including about 70 girls. The club is able to provide high quality training facilities on both synthetic and natural grass and within the training hall.  In 2007 and 2008 the B-juniors won the Kokkola Cup.

2010 season

SiPS First Team are competing in the Kolmonen administered by the Itä-Suomi SPL and Keski-Suomi SPL.  This is the fourth highest tier in the Finnish football system.  In 2009 SiPS were promoted from the Nelonen.

SiPS/2 are participating in Section C (Lohko C) of the Vitonen administered by the Itä-Suomi SPL.

References and sources
Official Website
Finnish Wikipedia
Suomen Cup

Footnotes

Football clubs in Finland
Siilinjärvi
1974 establishments in Finland